Tomb TT194, located in the necropolis of El-Assasif in Thebes, Egypt, is the tomb of Thutemhab (Djehutyemhab), who was an overseer of the marshland-dwellers of the Estate of Amun and a scribe in the temple of Amun during the Nineteenth Dynasty of Egypt. Thutemhab's tomb is part of the TT192 tomb complex.

Thutemhab had a wife named Nedjemetmut. Two brothers named Amenemopet and Amenhotep respectively are mentioned in the tomb.

See also
 List of Theban tombs

References

Theban tombs